Lee Sang-hyun (이상현) (born January 1, 1955) is a South Korean sculptor.

References

External links
 Official website
 

1955 births
South Korean sculptors
Living people
Place of birth missing (living people)